Maja Maranow (20 March 1961 – 4 January 2016) was a German actress. She appeared in more than 60 films and television shows between 1983 and 2016.

On January 4, 2016, Maranow died of breast cancer in Berlin, aged 54.

Selected filmography
 Tage im Hotel (1983)
 Andre Handles Them All (1985)
  (1987, TV series, 6 episodes)
 Rivalen der Rennbahn (1989, TV series, 11 episodes)
 Jolly Joker (1991, TV series, 21 episodes)
 Private Crimes (1993, TV miniseries, 3 episodes)
 Ein starkes Team (1994–2016, TV series, 63 episodes)
  (1994, TV film)
  (1998, TV series, 8 episodes)
  (2001, TV film)
  (2002, TV film)
 Die Affäre Semmeling (2002, TV miniseries, 6 episodes)
 Beloved Sisters (2014)

References

External links

1961 births
2016 deaths
German film actresses
German television actresses
20th-century German actresses
21st-century German actresses
People from Nienburg, Lower Saxony
Deaths from cancer in Germany
Deaths from breast cancer